The 2009–10 Turkish Cup, also known due to sponsorship reasons as the Ziraat Türkiye Kupası, was the 48th edition of the annual tournament that determined the association football Süper Lig Turkish Cup champion under the auspices of the Turkish Football Federation (TFF). Seven-time defenders Trabzonspor successfully contested the four time defending champions, Istanbul-based Beşiktaş in the final, 3-1 The competition began on 2 September 2009 with the first round and concluded on 5 May 2010 with the final, held at Şanlıurfa GAP Stadium. This tournament was conducted under the UEFA Cup system having replaced at the 44th edition a standard knockout competition scheme. 

Trabzonspor advanced to the play-off round of the 2010–11 UEFA Europa League. Beşiktaş were the defending champions.

Teams

First round
The draw for the First Round took place at the headquarters of the TFF in İstanbul on 25 August 2009. The matches were played on 2 September 2009.

Second round
The draw for the Second Round was conducted at the headquarters of the TFF in İstanbul on 15 September 2009. The matches were played on 30 September 2009.

Play-off round
The draw for the Third Round was conducted at the headquarters of the TFF in İstanbul on 19 October 2009. The matches were played starting on 28 October 2009.

Group stage
The group stage consisted of four groups with five teams each. The top four teams that finished from 1st place to 4th in the 2008–09 Süper Lig were seeded as group heads: Beşiktaş, Sivasspor, Trabzonspor and Fenerbahçe. The sixteen teams who qualified through the first two rounds of elimination matches were randomly drawn into one of the four groups.

Every team played every other team of its group once, either home or away. The winners and runners-up of each group qualified for the quarterfinals.

Group A

Group B

Group C

Group D

Bracket

Quarter-finals
In this round the winners and runners-up of all of the previous round's groups were entered. The draw was conducted at the headquarters of the TFF in İstanbul on 27 January 2010 at 11:00 local time. The teams competed in two-leg playoffs with the first leg occurring on 3 February and the second on 10 February 2010.

The following teams qualified for the Turkish Cup Quarterfinal:

Semi-finals
The two legs were played on 24 March and 14 April 2010, respectively.

Final

The final was won by Trabzonspor.

References

External links
 Official site 
 Türkiye Kupası Haberleri

2009-10
Cup
Turkey